Elisabeth and the Fool (German: Elisabeth und der Narr) is a 1934 German drama film directed by Thea von Harbou and starring Hertha Thiele, Theodor Loos and Rudolf Klein-Rogge.  The film was the directing debut of Harbou, who was known for her screenplays for directors such as Fritz Lang and F. W. Murnau. Filming began on 12 October 1933 in Meersburg and the Lake Constance area. The film's sets were designed by the art directors Kurt Dürnhöfer and Walter Reimann. The film premiered on 24 January 1934.

Synopsis
It tells the story of a young woman at a girls' boarding school connected to a monastery, and the intrigues caused by a man who is obsessed with the monastery's organ.

Cast

References

Bibliography 
 Bock, Hans-Michael & Bergfelder, Tim. The Concise Cinegraph: Encyclopaedia of German Cinema. Berghahn Books, 2009.
 Dixon, Wheeler Winston & Foster, Gwendolyn Audrey. A Short History of Film. Rutgers University Press, 2013.

External links

1934 films
Films directed by Thea von Harbou
Films of Nazi Germany
German drama films
1930s German-language films
German black-and-white films
1934 drama films
1934 directorial debut films
1930s German films